Hyperbolus (Hyperbolos; died 411 BC) was an Athenian politician active during the first half of the Peloponnesian war, coming to particular prominence after the death of Cleon.  In 416 or 415 he was the last Athenian to be ostracised.

Life
A fragment of Theopompus suggests that Hyperbolus was the son of Chremes, but surviving ostraka prove that his father's name was actually Antiphanes.  Some ancient sources claim that Hyperbolus was from a slave family, though the fact that his father had a Greek name makes this unlikely.

Hyperbolus was a demagogue, and an allusion in Aristophanes' play The Knights suggests that he – like Cleon, another demagogue of the late fifth century – supported an ambitious Athenian foreign policy.  The precise details of his political career are unknown, but he seems to have been a member of the boule and possibly a trierarch.

Hyperbolus was a frequent target of the authors of Old Comedy.  The first to satirise him was supposedly Hermippus; Plato the comic poet and Eupolis wrote plays about him; and there are allusions to Hyperbolus in seven of Aristophanes' surviving plays, from Acharnians in 425 to The Frogs in 405 BC.  By contrast, only a single "contemptuous" reference to Hyperbolus is found in Thucydides.

In 416 or 415, Hyperbolus proposed an ostracism, and was himself ostracised.  In 412/11 he was murdered on Samos.  According to Thucydides, the Athenian general Charminus was involved in the killing.  Theopompus claims that Hyperbolus' body was stuffed into a wineskin and thrown into the sea; this may be derived from a comedy.

Ostracism
Sometime in the years 417–415 BC Hyperbolus was ostracised.  According to Plutarch, who described the ostracism in three of his Lives, the ostracism was proposed by Hyperbolus himself, intending to have either Nicias or Alcibiades – Theophrastus says Alcibiades or Phaeax – ostracised; the two politicians put aside their differences and persuaded their supporters to vote to ostracise Hyperbolus instead.

The date of the ostracism is uncertain.  It was traditionally thought that Hyperbolus was ostracised in 417, six years before he was murdered.  However, an inscription naming Hyperbolus as the proposer of an amendment to a law was restored in 1949 by A. G. Woodhead, which suggests that he was still active after an ostracism in 417 ought to have taken place.  As Nicias and Alcibiades were potential victims of the ostracism, however, it cannot have taken place any later than 415; 415 and 416 are thus the only possible years that the ostracism can be dated to.  P. J. Rhodes suggests that 415 is slightly more likely.

Legacy
Ostracism does not seem ever to have been used again in Athens after Hyperbolus, though the practice was never formally abolished.  According to Plutarch, this was because the Athenians were so disgusted with the outcome of the ostracism that they abandoned the practice.  Rhodes argues, however, that ostracism was in fact abandoned because it was too imprecise, and from the late fifth century the Athenians began to use more targeted methods for holding office-holders to account.  For instance, 415, the probable date of the last ostracism, is also the earliest date the graphe paranomon is known to have been in use.

References

Works cited

External links

Ostracized Athenians
5th-century BC Greek people
411 BC deaths
Year of birth unknown
Ancient Greek statesmen
Ancient Greeks who were murdered